Bertil Rudolf Tage Norberg (14 July 1910 – 24 March 1995) was a Swedish ice hockey player. He competed in the men's tournament at the 1936 Winter Olympics.

References

1910 births
1995 deaths
Ice hockey players at the 1936 Winter Olympics
Olympic ice hockey players of Sweden
Ice hockey people from Stockholm
Swedish ice hockey players